Dávid Gríger (born November 28, 1994) is a Slovak professional ice hockey centre for the HC Bílí Tygři Liberec of the Czech Extraliga.
 
Griger made his professional debut in the Slovak Extraliga playing with HK Poprad during the 2012–13 Slovak Extraliga season before joining Karlovy Vary in 2013.

Career statistics

Regular season and playoffs

International

References

External links

1994 births
Living people
HC Dukla Jihlava players
HC Karlovy Vary players
HK Poprad players
HC Bílí Tygři Liberec players
Slovak ice hockey centres
Sportspeople from Poprad
Slovak expatriate ice hockey players in the Czech Republic